Mount Tambora is a volcano on the island of Sumbawa in present-day Indonesia, then part of the Dutch East Indies, and its 1815 eruption was the most powerful volcanic eruption in recorded human history. This  volcanic explosivity index (VEI) 7 eruption ejected  of material into the atmosphere, and was the most recent confirmed VEI-7 eruption.

Although the Mount Tambora eruption reached a violent climax on 10 April 1815, increased steaming and small phreatic eruptions occurred during the next six months to three years. The ash from the eruption column dispersed around the world and lowered global temperatures in an event sometimes known as the Year Without a Summer in 1816. This brief period of significant climate change triggered extreme weather and harvest failures in many areas around the world. Several climate forcings coincided and interacted in a systematic manner that has not been observed after any other large volcanic eruption since the early Stone Age.

Chronology of the eruption

Mount Tambora experienced several centuries of dormancy before 1815, caused by the gradual cooling of hydrous magma in its closed magma chamber. In 1812, the volcano began to rumble and generated a dark cloud.
On the morning of 6 April, volcanic ash began to fall in East Java with faint detonation sounds lasting until 10 April.

At about 19:00 on 10 April, the eruptions intensified. Three plumes rose up and merged. The whole mountain was turned into a flowing mass of "liquid fire". Pyroclastic flows cascaded down the mountain to the sea on all sides of the peninsula, wiping out the village of Tambora. Loud explosions were heard until the next evening, 11 April. The ash veil spread as far as West Java and South Sulawesi. A nitrous odor was noticeable in Batavia, and heavy tephra-tinged rain fell, finally receding between 11 and 17 April.

The explosion had an estimated VEI of 7. An estimated  of pyroclastic trachyandesite were ejected, weighing about 10 billion tonnes. After the explosion, its peak elevation had dropped to only , about two-thirds of its previous height.

The 1815 Tambora eruption is the largest observed eruption in recorded history, as shown in the table below.

Aftermath

All vegetation on the island was destroyed. Clouds of thick ash still covered the summit on 23 April. Explosions ceased on 15 July, although smoke emissions were observed as late as 23 August. Flames and rumbling aftershocks were reported in August 1819, four years after the event.

The total death toll has been estimated to be around 4,600.

Longitudinal winds spread these fine particles around the globe, creating optical phenomena. Prolonged and brilliantly coloured sunsets and twilights were seen frequently in London between 28 June and 2 July 1815 and 3 September and 7 October 1815. The glow of the twilight sky typically appeared orange or red near the horizon and purple or pink above.

The estimated number of deaths varies depending on the source. Zollinger (1855) puts the number of direct deaths at 10,000, probably caused by pyroclastic flows. On Sumbawa, 18,000 starved to death or died of disease. About 10,000 people on Lombok died from disease and hunger. Petroeschevsky (1949) estimated that about 48,000 people were killed on Sumbawa and 44,000 on Lombok. Stothers in 1984 and several other authors have accepted Petroeschevsky's claim of 88,000 deaths in total. However, a 1998 journal article authored by J. Tanguy and others claimed that Petroeschevsky's figures were unfounded and based on untraceable references. Tanguy's revision of the death toll was based on Zollinger's work on Sumbawa for several months after the eruption and on Thomas Raffles's notes. Tanguy pointed out that there may have been additional victims on Bali and East Java because of famine and disease. Their estimate was 11,000 deaths from direct volcanic effects and 49,000 by post-eruption famine and epidemic diseases. Oppenheimer wrote that there were at least 71,000 deaths in total. Reid has estimated that 100,000 people on Sumbawa, Bali, and other locations died from the direct and indirect effects of the eruption.

Disruption of global temperatures
The eruption caused a volcanic winter. This very significant cooling directly or indirectly caused 90,000 deaths. The eruption of Mount Tambora was the most significant cause of this climate anomaly.

The VEI is used to quantify the amount of ejected material, with a VEI-7 being . Every index value below that is one order of magnitude (meaning, ten times) less. Furthermore, the 1815 eruption occurred during a Dalton Minimum, a period of unusually low solar radiation. Volcanism plays a large role in climate shifts, both locally and globally. This was not always understood and did not enter scientific circles as fact until the 1883 eruption of Krakatoa tinted the skies orange.

The scale of the volcanic eruption will determine the significance of the impact on climate and other chemical processes, but a change will be measured even in the most local of environments. When volcanoes erupt, they eject carbon dioxide (CO2), water, hydrogen, sulfur dioxide (SO2), hydrogen chloride, hydrogen fluoride, and many other gases.(Meronen et al. 2012) CO2 and water are greenhouse gases, comprising 0.0415 percent and 0.4 percent of the atmosphere, respectively. Their small proportion disguises their significant role in trapping solar insolation and reradiating it back to Earth.

Global effects

The 1815 eruption released SO2 into the stratosphere, causing a global climate anomaly. Different methods have estimated the ejected sulphur mass during the eruption: the petrological method; an optical depth measurement based on anatomical observations; and the polar ice core sulfate concentration method, using cores from Greenland and Antarctica. The figures vary depending on the method, ranging from 10 to 120 million tonnes.

In the spring and summer of 1815, a persistent "dry fog" was observed in the northeastern United States. The fog reddened and dimmed the sunlight, such that sunspots were visible to the naked eye. Neither wind nor rainfall dispersed the "fog". It was identified as a stratospheric sulfate aerosol veil. In summer 1816, countries in the Northern Hemisphere suffered extreme weather conditions, dubbed the "Year Without a Summer". On 4 June 1816, frosts were reported in the upper elevations of New Hampshire, Maine, Vermont, and northern New York. On 6 June 1816, snow fell in Albany, New York and Dennysville, Maine. Such conditions occurred for at least three months and ruined most agricultural crops in North America. Canada experienced extreme cold during that summer.

The second-coldest year in the Northern Hemisphere since around 1400 was 1816, and the 1810s are the coldest decade on record. That was the consequence of Tambora's 1815 eruption and possibly another VEI-6 eruption in late 1808. Parts of Europe also experienced a stormier winter.

This climate anomaly has been blamed for the severity of typhus epidemics in southeast Europe and along the eastern Mediterranean Sea between 1816 and 1819. The climate changes disrupted the Indian monsoons, caused three failed harvests and famine, and contributed to the spread of a new strain of cholera that originated in Bengal in 1816. Many livestock died in New England during the winter of 1816–1817. Cool temperatures and heavy rains resulted in failed harvests in the British Isles. Families in Wales travelled long distances as refugees, begging for food. Famine was prevalent in north and southwest Ireland, following the failure of wheat, oat, and potato harvests. The crisis was severe in Germany, where food prices rose sharply, and demonstrations in front of grain markets and bakeries, followed by riots, arson, and looting, took place in many European cities. It was the worst famine of the 19th century.

Effects of volcanism

Volcanism affects the atmosphere in two distinct ways: short-term cooling caused by reflected insolation and long-term warming from increased CO2 levels. Most of the water vapor and CO2 is collected in clouds within a few weeks to months because both are already present in large quantities, so the effects are limited. It has been suggested that a volcanic eruption in 1809 may also have contributed to a reduction in global temperatures.

Impact of the eruption

By most calculations, the eruption of Tambora was at least a full order of magnitude (10 times) larger than that of Mount Pinatubo in 1991.(Graft et al. 1993) An estimated  of the top of the mountain collapsed to form a caldera, reducing the height of the summit by a third. The ash burned and smothered crops, creating an immediate shortage of food in Indonesia.(Cole-Dai et al. 2009) The ejection of these gases, especially hydrogen chloride, caused the precipitation to be extremely acidic, killing much of the crops that survived or were rebudding during the spring. The food shortages were compounded by the Napoleonic wars, floods, and cholera.

The ash in the atmosphere for several months after the eruption reflected significant amounts of solar radiation, causing unseasonably cool summers that contributed to food shortages. China, Europe, and North America had well-documented below normal temperatures, which devastated their harvests. The monsoon season in China and India was altered, causing flooding in the Yangtze Valley and forcing thousands of Chinese to flee coastal areas. (Granados et al. 2012) The gases also reflected some of the already-decreased incoming solar radiation, causing a  decrease in global temperatures throughout the decade. An ice dam formed in Switzerland during the summers of 1816 and 1817, earning 1816 the title "Year without a Summer". The winter months of 1816 were not much different from previous years, but the spring and summer maintained the cool-to-freezing temperatures. The winter of 1817, however, was radically different, with temperatures below  in central and northern New York, which were cold enough to freeze lakes and rivers that were normally used to transport supplies. The length of the growing seasons in parts of Massachusetts and New Hampshire were less than 80 days in 1816, resulting in harvest failures (Oppenheimer 2003). Visually unique sunsets were observed in western Europe, and red fog was observed along the eastern coast of the U.S. These unique atmospheric conditions persisted for the better part of 2.5 years.(Robock 2000)

Scientists have used ice cores to monitor atmospheric gases during the cold decade (1810–1819), and the results have been puzzling. The sulfate concentrations found in both Siple Station, Antarctica and central Greenland bounced from 5.0 in January 1816 to 1.1 in August 1818. This means that 25–30 teragrams of sulfur were ejected into the atmosphere, most of which came from Tambora, followed by a rapid decrease through natural processes. Tambora caused the largest shift in sulfur concentrations in ice cores for the past 5,000 years. Estimates of the sulfur yield vary from 10 teragrams (Black et al. 2012) to 120 teragrams,(Stothers 2000) with the average of the estimates being 25–30 teragrams.

Climate data have shown that the variance between daily lows and highs may have played a role in the lower average temperature because the fluctuations were much more subdued. Generally, the mornings were warmer because of nightly cloud cover and the evenings were cooler because the clouds had dissipated. There were documented fluctuations of cloud cover for various locations that suggested it was a nightly occurrence and the sun killed them off, much like a fog. This meant that the mean annual cycle in 1816 was more linear than bell shaped and 1817 endured cooling across the board. Southeastern England, northern France, and the Netherlands experienced the greatest amount of cooling in Europe, accompanied by New York, New Hampshire, Delaware, and Rhode Island in North America.
The documented rainfall was as much as 80 percent more than the calculated normal with regards to 1816, with unusually high amounts of snow in Switzerland, France, Germany, and Poland. This is again contrasted by the unusually low precipitations in 1818, which caused droughts throughout most of Europe and Asia.(Auchmann et al. 2012) Russia had already experienced unseasonably warm and dry summers since 1815 and this continued for the next three years. There are also documented reductions in ocean temperature near the Baltic Sea, the North Sea, and the Mediterranean Sea. This seems to have been an indicator of shifted oceanic circulation patterns and possibly changed wind direction and speed.(Meronen et al. 2012)

Taking into account the Dalton Minimum and the presence of famine and droughts predating the eruption, the Tambora eruption accelerated or exacerbated the extreme climate conditions of 1815. While other eruptions and other climatological events would have led to a global cooling of about 
, Tambora increased on that benchmark substantially.

Comparison of selected volcanic eruptions

Source: Oppenheimer (2003), and Smithsonian Global Volcanism Program for VEI.

See also

Dalton Minimum
Volcanic winter of 536
List of large Holocene volcanic eruptions
List of volcanic eruptions by death toll
List of volcanoes in Indonesia
Volcanism of Indonesia
Year Without a Summer

References

External links
 DW Documentary, published October 23, 2019

1815 in Asia
1815 in Indonesia
Eruption Of Mount Tambora, 1815
Tambora
April 1815 events
Events that forced the climate
Plinian eruptions
Tambora
Volcanic eruptions in Indonesia
Volcanic tsunamis
Volcanic winters
Volcanism of Indonesia